Mark W. Libby is an American diplomat who is the nominee to be the United States Ambassador to Azerbaijan.

Early life and education
A native of New England and graduate of Pomperaug High School in Southbury, CT, Libby obtained a Bachelor’s Degree from Tufts University.  He also studied at the Institut des Etudes Politiques Sciences-Po in Paris, France. He earned a Master’s Degree from the National War College, where he was a Distinguished Graduate.

Career
Libby is a career member of the Senior Foreign Service, with the rank of Minister-Counselor. He currently serves as a Faculty Advisor for the United States Department of State at the National War College in Washington, D.C. Previously, he served as Deputy Chief of Mission and Chargé d'Affaires ad interim at the United States Mission to the European Union in Brussels, Belgium. Libby served in several areas overseas, including Warsaw, Nassau, Nicosia, and Baghdad. In Washington D.C., he served as a watch-stander and later deputy director for Crisis Management in the State Department Operations Center. Other assignments within the State Department include deputy director in the Office of Central European Affairs, Director of the Office of Southern European Affairs, and Director of Orientation at the Foreign Service Institute.

Ambassador to Azerbaijan
On May 25, 2022, President Joe Biden nominated Libby to be the United States ambassador to Azerbaijan. His nomination expired at the end of the year and was returned to Biden on January 3, 2023.

President Biden renominated Libby the same day. His nomination is pending before the Senate Foreign Relations Committee.

Personal life
Libby speaks Polish and French.

References

Living people
Tufts University alumni
National War College alumni
United States Foreign Service personnel
American diplomats
Year of birth missing (living people)